Charles Wilburn "Buck" Trent (born February 17, 1938) is an American country music instrumentalist currently performing in Branson, Missouri. He invented the electric banjo and also plays the five-string banjo, dobro, steel guitar, mandolin, electric bass and guitar.

Biography
Born and raised in Spartanburg, South Carolina, Trent was performing on radio stations WORD and WSPA in Spartansburg by age 11. He traveled to California and Texas, finally arriving in Nashville in 1959 where he joined the Bill Carlisle Show and first appeared on the Grand Ole Opry. He was a member of Bill Monroe's Bluegrass Boys from 1960-1961, Porter Wagoner's "Wagon Masters" from 1962 to 1973, and also appeared on the Roy Clark Show and Hee Haw from 1974 to 1982. He played lead guitar on Dolly Parton's "I Will Always Love You" and "Jolene". In 2012 Buck was featured on two songs on Marty Stuart's album, "Nashville, Vol. 1: Tear the Woodpile Down".

Over his long history, Trent has received many awards and nominations. He and Roy Clark were twice named the Country Music Association Instrumental Group of the Year (1975, 1976) and he was twice the No. 1 Instrumentalist of the Year for the Music City Awards. Included in his nominations are the 1976 No. 1 Instrumentalist of the Year for Record World, 1972 through 1981 No. 1 Instrumentalist for the Music City News Awards and in 1979–1981 Instrumental Group of the Year (with Wendy Holcomb in the Bluegrass category) for the Music City News Awards.

In addition to The Porter Wagoner Show and Hee Haw, other television credits for Trent include The Marty Stuart Show,  Country's Family Reunion on RFD-TV, Mike Douglas Show, The Tonight Show, Nashville on the Road, Tommy Hunter Show, Dinah!, Command Performance, Music City Tonight, and Nashville Now.

Trent's performing career also includes many touring shows, in particular he toured the Soviet Union with Roy Clark in 1976. This was the first country music act to tour the Soviet Union. In the early 1980s while on tour with the Porter Wagoner Show, Trent came to Branson, Missouri and performed at the Baldknobber's Jamboree Theatre. Several years later he opened for Mickey Gilley at the Mickey Gilley Theatre in Branson, Missouri and then in 1990 he became the first national act to open a live music show in Branson, performed in the morning. Trent's current morning show in Branson, Missouri is called Buck Trent Country Music Show and (as of November 2015) is performed at Baldknobbers Jamboree Theatre. In 2016, his show moved to the Jim Stafford Theater. In 2017, he moved to the Branson Famous Theatre with the Baldknobbers.

Trent is also known for his signature phrase, "Uh-huh, oh yeah," a phrase that originated in a sketch he performed on Hee Haw. He still utters the phrase as part of his shows, accompanied by a thumbs-up gesture.

Discography
The Sound of Bluegrass Banjo, 1962
The Sound of Five String Banjo, 1962
Gime Five, 1966
5-string General, 1967
Sounds of Now and Beyond, 1972
A Pair of Fives (Banjos That Is), 1974 (with Roy Clark)
Bionic Banjo, 1976
Oh Yeah! Banjos, Boisterous Ballads, And Buck, 1977
Banjo Bandits, 1978 (with Roy Clark)
Spartanburg Blues, 2018

References

External links
Buck Trent.com
  

American country singer-songwriters
American banjoists
Living people
1938 births
Musicians from Spartanburg, South Carolina
Guitarists from South Carolina
American male guitarists
20th-century American guitarists
Country musicians from South Carolina
20th-century American male musicians
American male singer-songwriters
Singer-songwriters from South Carolina